The Duke's Children is a novel by Anthony Trollope, first published in 1879 as a serial in All the Year Round. It is the sixth and final novel of the Palliser series. In 2020, the original text of The Duke's Children was restored for publication of a new edition led by editor Steven Amarnick.

Synopsis
Lady Glencora, the wife of Plantagenet Palliser, the Duke of Omnium,  dies unexpectedly, leaving the devastated Duke to deal with their grownup children, with whom he has had a somewhat distant relationship. As the government in which he is Prime Minister has also fallen, the Duke is left bereft of both his beloved wife and his political position.

Before her death, Lady Glencora had given her private blessing to her daughter Mary's courtship by a poor gentleman, Frank Tregear, a friend of Mary's older brother, Lord Silverbridge. Mrs Finn, Lady Glencora's dearest confidante, somewhat uneasily remains after the funeral as a companion and unofficial chaperone for Lady Mary at the Duke's request. Once she becomes aware of the seriousness of the relationship between Mary and Frank, Mrs Finn insists that the Duke be informed.

Managing the Duke's two sons also proves troublesome. At first, Lord Silverbridge follows the wishes of his father by entering Parliament, and proposes to Lady Mabel Grex, whom he has known all his life, and of whom the Duke approves. She turns Silverbridge down, due to his immaturity, although with a hint of a more welcoming answer another time. In the meanwhile, however, Silverbridge becomes enamoured of American heiress Isabel Boncassen. She agrees to marry him only if the Duke is willing to welcome her into the family. At first, the Duke disapproves; and he disapproves even more of his daughter's suitor.  To add to his troubles, Gerald, his younger son, gets expelled from Cambridge after attending the Derby without permission.

However, by the end of the book, the Duke grows closer to all three of his children; he allows the engagements of his oldest son and daughter, and he is invited once more to take a part in the government.

Historical setting
Marriages of rich American young women to British aristocrats had just begun to take place when Trollope wrote this book. One of the first such marriages had been that of Lord Randolph Churchill to Jennie Jerome, five years before the book was written—a love match, as is that of Silverbridge and Isabel Boncassen. One difference is that, in the novel, Silverbridge will be very rich in his own right; whereas many Anglo-American marriages transpired in order to import much-needed American money into financially stressed British aristocratic families (a situation similar to that of the Gresham family in Trollope's novel Doctor Thorne).

Critical reception
A 2017 book review by Kirkus Reviews summarized the book as "A thoroughly satisfying classic for those who love long, slow Victorian family dramas." Reviewing the extended and restored version of the book in 2015 for The New York Times, Charles McGrath wrote, "The new version will most likely not change anyone’s view of “The Duke’s Children,” and yet all those tiny excisions do add up. The restored version is a fuller, richer book."

References

External links
 
 

 

1879 British novels
Novels by Anthony Trollope
Novels first published in serial form
Works originally published in All the Year Round
Chapman & Hall books